Jacob Senleches (fl. 1382/1383 – 1395) (also Jacob de Senlechos [i.e. Senleches] and Jacopinus Senlesses) was a Franco-Flemish composer and harpist of the late Middle Ages. He composed in a style commonly known as the ars subtilior.

Life and career
It has been suggested that Jacob Senleches was born in Senleches (or Sanlesches) in Cambrai, today France. In 1382, Senleches seems to have been present at the court of Eleanor of Aragon, Queen of Castile (d. September 1382), possibly in her service. In Fuions de ci, he laments Eleanor's death and resolves to seek his fortune either "en Aragon, en France ou en Bretaingne".

Afterwards, he is found in the service of Pedro de Luna, Cardinal of Aragon (later Antipope Benedict XIII, 1394–1423), as a harpist. There is a treasury document assigning payments to one "Jaquemin de Sanleches, juglar de harpe" from the royal household in Navarra dated August 21, 1383. The payment was made so that Jacquemin could return to "his master", Pedro de Luna. In a document related to the coronation of Pedro de Luna as Antipope Benedict XIII, "Jacobus de Senleches" was granted on 30 October 1394 a canonicate with expectation of a prebend at the Basilica of Saint Martin, Tours.

Despite the small number of transmitted compositions, Jacob de Senleches is counted among the central personalities of Ars subtilior. All his compositions are polyphonic settings of French texts for three parts. Some texts appear autobiographical while others participate in a widespread tradition of textual and musical citation. Senleches developed many distinctive rhythmic and notational innovations.

Works

Ballades:
 En attendant esperance
 Fuions de ci
 Je me merveil/ J'ay pluseurs fois

Virelai
 En ce gracieux tamps
 La harpe de melodie
 Tel me voit

Media

Transcriptions
Corpus mensurabilis musicae Vol. 53 – French Secular Compositions I, Ascribed Compositions (1970)

References

Sources
Günther, Ursula, and Maricarmen Gomez. "Senleches, Jacquemin De." In The New Grove Dictionary of Music and Musicians, edited by Stanley Sadie, 87–88. London: Grove, 2001.
Jacob de Senleches; in: Die Musik in Gegenwart und Geschichte, Personenteil, Ed. L. Finscher, Kassel, London, 2003/2.
Planchart, Alejandro Enrique. Guillaume Du Fay: The Life and Works, 2 vols., Cambridge, Cambridge University Press, 2017.
Stoessel, Jason. "Symbolic Innovation: The Notation of Jacob De Senleches." Acta Musicologica 71/2 (1999): 136–64.
Tomasello, Andrew. Music and Ritual at Papal Avignon 1309–1403. Studies in Musicology 75.  Ann Arbor: UMI Research Press, 1983.

Further reading

External links

 

French classical composers
French male classical composers
Ars subtilior composers
14th-century births
Year of death unknown
14th-century French composers
Medieval male composers